Twister OS (Twister for short) is a 32-bit Operating System created by Pi Labs for the Raspberry Pi single board computer originally, with a x86_64 PC version released a few months later. Twister is based on Raspberry Pi OS Lite and uses the XFCE desktop environment.  Twister OS also has a version called "Twister OS Armbian" designed for ARM SBCs with the RK3399 CPU. There are four versions of the operating system, TwisterOS Full (for the Raspberry Pi 4), Twister OS Lite (a stripped-down version with only themes), Twister UI (For x86_64 PCs running Linux Mint or Xubuntu) and Twisters OS Armbian (for RK3399 CPUs) .

Features 
TwisterOS has 7 main desktop themes, 5 out of those have dark modes. Twister OS has its own theme called "Twister OS theme" which is similar to Ubuntu's desktop theme. The Twister 95, XP, 7, 10, and 11 themes are similar to the themes on the Windows 95, XP, 7, 10 and 11 operating systems. iTwister and iTwister Sur desktop themes are similar to the themes on macOS.

Box86 is an emulator used to run x86 software and games on ARM systems.

Wine is a compatibility layer that lets the user to run Windows applications on non-Windows systems.

CommanderPi is a system monitoring and configuration tool designed to check system information and overclock the CPU.

Other Twister versions

Twister OS Lite 
Twister OS Lite is for the Raspberry Pi as well. The Lite version only comes with the themes in Twister OS, as well as Box86 and Wine.

Twister UI 
Twister UI is very similar to Twister OS, the only difference is that Twister UI is used for non-single board computers.  Twister UI is designed to be installed by running a setup script on an already running installation of Linux Mint (XFCE) or Xubuntu.

Twister OS Armbian 
Twister OS Armbian is a version of Twister OS that can run on SBCs with RK3399 CPUs, like the Rock Pi 4B. Twister OS Armbian also comes preinstalled on emmc chips inside the Rock Pi 4 Plus models. Twister OS Armbian is based on the Armbian Linux operating system.

References 

Computers
Linux